Tinguaro (or Chimechia) (died December 1495) was a Guanche sigoñe (warrior) of Tenerife, also known as Achimenchia Tinguaro.  He was in charge of the area known as Acentejo.  Half-brother of the mencey (king) Bencomo, Tinguaro led the Guanche forces to victory against the invading Castilians in the First Battle of Acentejo.  He fell at the Battle of Aguere, a crushing defeat for the original population of the island, resulting in the conquest of the island by the Castilians.

References
 José Juan Acosta; Félix Rodríguez Lorenzo; Carmelo L. Quintero Padrón, Conquista y Colonización (Santa Cruz de Tenerife: Centro de la Cultura Popular Canaria, 1988), p. 51-2.
  Batalla de Acentejo
  510 Aniversario de la Batalla de Acentejo: La Derrota de un Imperio

Tinguaro
Tinguaro
Tinguaro
Guanche
Guanche people
Year of birth unknown